The Saudi Commission for Health Specialties (SCFHS) is a Saudi Arabian scientific commission that regulates health care-related practices and accreditation at all levels in Saudi Arabia. The SCFHS was established on the 2 June 1992 by Royal Order M/2 to set standards for health practice. Its headquarters is in Riyadh and it has several branch offices across the Kingdom. The Chairman of the Commission's Board of Trustees is the Minister of Health, His Excellency Fahad Al-Jalajel, its Secretary General is Prof. Aws I. Alshamsan, and the Secretary General Deputies, where one of them is assigned for executive affairs. SCFHS has been in service for more than a quarter century now.

Vision
A healthy community through competent healthcare providers based on high standards.

Mission
Protection and promotion of Health led by compassionate and competent practitioners.

Values
Innovation 
Quality 

Professionalism 

Fairness 

Patient's Safety

Board of Trustees
According to its Statute, issued by Royal Decree No. M/2, dated 6/3/1413 AH, SCFHS is a professional scientific commission which has a legal entity, supervised by a Board of Trustees. 
Article (5) of the Statute defines the Board of Trustees’ responsibilities as follows:
  Carry out and monitor SCFHS objectives and tasks.
  Approve SCFHS’ internal statute and set wages, salaries, incentives, memberships, membership renewals, administrative and financial tasks, terms of employment, administrative structure, member roles, disciplinary measures and other executive and technical responsibilities.
  Approve SCFHS’ budget, hire a chartered accountant and approve the balance sheet.
  Suggest amendments for SCFHS’ statute.
  Review the instructions and regulations governing health-related majors and professions, including the roles and responsibilities of practitioners, in addition to suggesting recommendations to develop those instructions and regulations and submitting them to the relevant authorities.
  Accept gifts and donations.
  Approve the investment policy for SCFHS’ revenues and savings.
  Set the executive regulations for SCFHS’ statute.

Education and Training Executive Board
This Board is responsible for executive decisions and regulations which are related to accrediting, training and assessment in accordance with the commission's regulations and bylaws adopted by the Board of Trustees. It aims to approve the organizational regulations for education and training in addition to the executive regulations related to accreditation, training and assessment in consistence with regulations in force. Education and Training board consists of 27 members, those of competence, experience and high qualifications in health professions.

Professional Practice Executive Board

This board is responsible for executive decisions and regulations related to classification and registration in accordance with SCFHS regulations and bylaws adopted by the Board of Trustees. This board aims to approve the executive regulations for professional health practice and standards for classification of different professional ranks. In addition to developing health professions in Saudi Arabia. The Professional Practice Executive Board consists of 20 members, those of competence, experience and high qualifications in health professions.

See also

Saudi Council of Engineers

External links
 SCHS official website in English
 SCHS official website in Arabic

1992 establishments in Saudi Arabia
Government agencies established in 1992
Government agencies of Saudi Arabia
Medical and health organisations based in Saudi Arabia
Accreditation in healthcare